Soggadu is a 2005 Indian Telugu-language romance film produced by D. Suresh on Suresh Productions banner. Directed by Ravi Babu, it stars Tarun and Aarthi Agarwal in lead roles. With special appearances by Venkatesh, Srikanth , Shriya Saran and Sumanth. Soggadu won good critical appreciation and technical acclaim for the director Ravi Babu. This film was remade in Hindi as Ajab Prem Ki Ghazab Kahani (2009) and in Bengali as Mon Je Kore Uru Uru (2010).

Plot

Ravi, a school dropout and vagabond, falls in love with Swati the minute he sets his eyes on her, but loses sight of her in a sea of people and traffic. As only a possessed lover can, he tries to find her in a city of ten million people. Armed with just the first three letters on the license plate of her car, he tries to find her whereabouts. After tumultuous attempts and near hits and misses, he manages to find her. Swati lived under the shadow of a tyrannical brother who was trying to get her married. Ravi manages to establish visual contact with Swathi and understands from her mute plight that she wanted to leave home. Ravi helps her escape home and is elated to know that she left home for him. His bubble quickly bursts when he learns that Swati had used his help to get to her lover Chandu. Ravi braves the goons who chase them, fights the tears of heartbreak, and decides to help Swathi meet her lover. This draws ire from Ravi's friends who had helped him all along in his love story. They think Ravi should dump the girl. He disagrees and they desert him. Armed only with unflinching, selfless love, Ravi embarks on an adventure with Swathi to find her lover Chandu. Finally, he manages to fight the goons of Swathi's brother and unites Swathi and Chandu. Ravi's selfless sacrifice melts Swathi's heart and makes her wonder what true love was.

Cast

Tarun as Ravi
Aarthi Agarwal as Swati
Jugal Hansraj as Chandu
Kota Srinivasa Rao as Ravi's father
Kavitha as Ravi's mother
Brahmanandam
Ali as Beggar
Subbaraju as GK, Swati's brother
Sudeepa Pinky as Ravi's sister
Gautam Raju as Ravi's uncle	
Krishna Bhagavan as Railway TC
Raghu Babu as Police Officer	
Gundu Hanumantha Rao as Lecturer Subba Rao
Vijay Sai as Cable Madhu
Viswa as Ravi's friend
M.S. Narayana
Hema
Narra Venkateswara Rao
Jeeva
Chittajalu Lakshmipati
Raj Kumar
Siva
Santosh
Charan
Nuthan Kumar
Sirisha
Kavitha Krishnaswamy
Bangalore Padma
Jaya Lakshmi				
Kalpana Rai
Master Karthik
Master Deepak
Sanjjanaa Galrani as Anu (uncredited cameo)
Venkatesh as Venkatesh (Cameo)
Shriya Saran as Shriya (Cameo)
Srikanth as himself (special appearance)
Sumanth as himself (special appearance)
Sunil as Venkat (guest appearance)

Soundtrack

Music composed by Chakri. Lyrics written by Bhaskarabhatla Ravikumar. Music released on ADITYA Music Company.

References

External links
 

2005 films
2000s Telugu-language films
Films scored by Chakri
Indian comedy films
Telugu films remade in other languages
Films directed by Ravi Babu
2005 comedy films
Suresh Productions films